Haji Baran is a village in Cheshmeh Ziarat Rural District, in the Central District of Zahedan County, Sistan and Baluchestan Province, Iran. According to the 2006 census, its population was 188, in 35 families.

References 

Populated places in Zahedan County